Guilty? is a 1930 American pre-Code drama film directed by George B. Seitz.

Cast
 Virginia Valli as Carolyn
 John Holland as Bob Lee
 John St. Polis as Polk
 Lydia Knott as Martha
 Erville Alderson as Lee
 Richard Carlyle as Dr. Bennett
 Clarence Muse as Jefferson
 Eddie Clayton as Jerry
 Robert T. Haines as Prosecuting Attorney
 Frank Fanning as Warden
 Edward Cecil as Judge
 Gertrude Howard as Lucy

References

External links

1930 films
1930 drama films
American drama films
American black-and-white films
1930s English-language films
Films directed by George B. Seitz
Columbia Pictures films
1930s American films